Thekkupalayam is a community in Coimbatore district, Tamil Nadu, India.

References

Geography of Tamil Nadu
Cities and towns in Coimbatore district